Andrea Gill (born 1948) is an American ceramist. 

Gill was born in Newark, New Jersey. She studied at the Rhode Island School of Design, where she received a BFA degree. In 1976 she received an MFA degree from the New York College of Ceramics at Alfred University.

Her work is included in the collections of the Smithsonian American Art Museum, and the Museum of Fine Arts, Houston.

References

1948 births
Living people
20th-century American artists
21st-century American artists
20th-century American women artists
21st-century American women artists
20th-century American ceramists
21st-century American ceramists
Artists from Newark, New Jersey